Burmali Minare Mosque ("Burmali Minare" means Spiral Minaret in Turkish) is a historical 13th century Mosque in Amasya, Turkey. The mosque was built between 1237 and 1247 by the Seljuks.

Building
The mosque is made of cut stone, the mosque is named after the elegant spiral carving on the minaret. 
There is also an adjoining Kumbet.

References

Amasya
Mosques completed in 1247
Mosques in Turkey